Fortuna Sittard is a football club in Sittard, Netherlands. The club currently plays its football in the 12,500 capacity Fortuna Sittard Stadion and features in the Eredivisie. The club was established through a merger of former clubs Fortuna 54 and Sittardia, which merged as the Fortuna Sittardia Combinatie on 1 July 1968.

History 
The club experienced mixed fortunes throughout its history although they were a regular fixture in the Eredivisie in the 1990s, with players such as Kevin Hofland, Mark van Bommel and Fernando Ricksen emerging from its youth system. These players later joined PSV Eindhoven and Rangers, and featured for the Netherlands national team. The team also signed Wilfred Bouma and Patrick Paauwe from the youth setup of PSV. Both players developed under manager Bert van Marwijk, before breaking into the Dutch national side and moving towards bigger clubs.

Fortuna 54 won the KNVB Cup in the 1956–57 season, and finished the Eredivisie season in second place behind champions Ajax. Sittardia were less successful and battled against relegation for many seasons. Fortuna 54 won the KNVB Cup again in 1964 before the merging of the two clubs in 1968 due to financial difficulties.

At the end of the 1999–2000 season, manager Bert van Marwijk left to join Feyenoord and the team was relegated to the First Division in the 2001–02 season. Financial irregularities were discovered and the team faced bankruptcy over several seasons. In the winter of 2003, two of the club's fans won the Dutch lottery and donated all of the prize money to the club. The club cleared most of their debts by selling off their new stadium, the Wagner & Partners stadium.

On 19 May 2009, the KNVB announced it would withdraw the club's license to play for the 2010–11 season. After going to civil court, this decision was revoked. Even though financial troubles kept plaguing the club, recent years have seen a slow but steady return to financial health, with sporting successes following suit. In the 2011–2012 season they missed qualification for the playoffs for promotion to the Eredivisie by a hair's breadth, conceding an equalizer in the dying seconds of the season in the home match against the Go Ahead Eagles, seeing them take the final playoff spot instead. In 2012–13 and 2013–14 they were successful in qualifying, having a first chance at returning to the Eredivisie since their relegation in 2002, but they lost both first round matches against De Graafschap.

In 2018, after 16 years in the Eerste Divisie, Fortuna won promotion to the Eredivisie again after beating Jong PSV 1–0 to stay clear from NEC and finishing runner-up to champions Jong Ajax, who are not allowed to promote.

The 2019–20 season ended with Fortuna in 16th place. But with the season being declared void, they will participate in Eredivisie in 2020–21.

Honours 
 KNVB Cup
 Winners: 1956–57, 1963–64
 Runners-up: 1983–84, 1998–99
 Eerste Divisie
 Winners: 1958–59, 1963–64, 1965–66, 1994–95
 Promoted: 1981–82, 2017–18

International

Totals

Results 

Below is a table with Fortuna Sittard's domestic results since the introduction of professional football in 1956.

Players

Current squad

Out on loan

Notable former players 

Bosnia and Herzegovina
  Emil Miljković
Cape Verde
  Lisandro Semedo
Democratic Republic of the Congo
  Jordan Botaka
  Samuel Moutoussamy
Curaçao
  Charlison Benschop
England
  Todd Cantwell 
Finland
  Rasmus Karjalainen
Greece
  Lazaros Rota
  Andreas Samaris
Moldova
  Vitalie Damașcan 
  Alexei Koselev
Netherlands
  Joos van Barneveld
  Mark van Bommel
  Fernando Ricksen
  Perr Schuurs
Poland
  Jarosław Jach
Slovakia
  Branislav Niňaj
Spain
  José Rodríguez
Sweden
  Tesfaldet Tekie

Club staff

Coaches 

As Fortuna '54
 1956–57:  Friedrich Donenfeld (vice champion, cup winner)
 1957–58:  Bram Appel
 1958–59:  Harry Verhardt
 1959–61:  Friedrich Donenfeld
 1961–63:  Jung Schlangen
 1963–65:  Wim Latten (cup winner 1964)
 1965–66:  Max Schirschin
 1966–67:  Karl-Heinz Marotzke
 1967–68:  Bram Appel

As Sittardia
 Frans Debruyn
 Vladimir Beara (1966–1968)
 Frans Debruyn (1968)

As Fortuna Sittard
 Frans Debruyn (1968–69)
 Henk Reuvers (1969–70)
 Evert Teunissen (1970–72)
 Cor Brom (1972–76)
 Cor van der Hart (1976–77)
 Joop Castenmiller (1977–80)
 Frans Körver (1980–84)
 Bert Jacobs (1984–87)
 Hans van Doorneveld (1987–89)
 Han Berger (1989–91)
 Georg Keßler (1991–92)
 Chris Dekker (1992–94)
 Pim Verbeek (1994–97)
 Bert van Marwijk (1997-00)
 Henk Duut (2000–01)

 Frans Thijssen (2000–01)
 Hans Verèl (2001)
 Hans de Koning (2001–04)
 Chris Dekker (2004–06)
 Frans Körver (2006–07)
 Henk Wisman (2007)
 Roger Reijners (2007–10)
 Wim Dusseldorp (2010–11)
 Tini Ruys (2011–12)
 Willy Boessen (2012–14)
 Peter van Vossen (2014–15)
 Ben van Dael (2015–16)
 Sunday Oliseh (2017–18)
 Claudio Braga (a.i.) (2018)
 René Eijer (2018–19)
 Sjors Ultee (2019–20)
 Kevin Hofland (2020)
 Sjors Ultee (2020–present)

Women's football 
On January 25, 2022 Fortuna announced they were beginning a women's football department. The club will start in the Dutch women's Eredivisie in season 2022/23.

Current squad

See also 
Dutch football league teams

References

External links 

  
Fansite Fortuna Supporters Collectief

 
Association football clubs established in 1968
1968 establishments in the Netherlands
Football clubs in the Netherlands
Football clubs in Sittard-Geleen
South Limburg (Netherlands)